Lieutenant-General Charles Nicolas Victor Oudinot, 2nd Duc de Reggio (3 November 1791 in Bar-le-Duc – 7 June 1863 in Bar-le-Duc), the eldest son of Napoleon I's marshal Nicolas Oudinot and Charlotte Derlin, also made a military career.

He served through the later campaigns of Napoleon, 1809–1814, and was promoted to major in 1814 for gallant conduct. Unlike his father he was a cavalryman, and after retirement during the early years of the Restoration held command of the cavalry school at Saumur (1822–1830) and was inspector-general of cavalry (1836–1848).

Oudinot is chiefly known as the commander of the French expedition that besieged and took Rome in 1849, crushing the short-lived revolutionary Roman Republic and re-establishing the temporal power of Pope Pius IX, under the protection of French arms. His brief published account presents the French view of the events. After Louis Napoleon's coup d'état of 2 December 1851, when he took a prominent part in the resistance in favour of the Second Republic, he retired from military and political life, though remaining in Paris.

Beside the brief memoir of his Italian operations in 1849, he wrote several works of more specialized interest, on military ranks and orders, the use of soldiers in constructing public works and cavalry and its proper housing: Aperçu historique sur la dignité de marechal de France (1833); Considérations sur les ordres militaires de Saint Louis, &c. (1833); "De L'Italie et de ses Forces Militaires" (1835);  L'Emploi des troupes aux grands travaux d'utilité publique (1839); De la Cavalerie et du casernement des troupes à cheval (1840); Des Remontes de l'armée (1840).

In the Luigi Magni's film In the Name of the Sovereign People (1990), Oudinot is played by Gianni Garko.

References

1791 births
1863 deaths
People from Bar-le-Duc
Charles
Politicians from Grand Est
Party of Order politicians
Members of the 6th Chamber of Deputies of the July Monarchy
Members of the 7th Chamber of Deputies of the July Monarchy
Members of the 1848 Constituent Assembly
Members of the National Legislative Assembly of the French Second Republic
French generals
French military writers
French military personnel of the Napoleonic Wars
French people of the Revolutions of 1848
Grand Croix of the Légion d'honneur
Commanders of the Order of Saint Louis
Burials at Père Lachaise Cemetery